Higher National Diploma (HND), part of the Higher Nationals suite of qualifications, is an academic higher education qualification in the United Kingdom and various other countries. They were first introduced in England and Wales in 1920 alongside the Ordinary National Diploma and the Higher National Certificate. A qualification of the same title is also offered in Argentina, Brunei, India, Malta, Nigeria, Ghana, Kenya, and some other countries with British ties.

Higher National Diplomas are graded, usually based on a weighted average (with higher weight given to marks in the final year of the course, and often zero weight to those in the first year) of the marks gained in exams and other assessments. Grade boundaries may vary by institution, but usually follow the boundaries given below:

Overview

In England, Wales, and Northern Ireland, the HND is a qualification awarded by many awarding bodies, such as the Confederation of Tourism and Hospitality (CTH Advanced diploma), Scottish Qualifications Authority (SQA) and BTEC (Vocational programs). In Scotland, a Higher National is awarded by the Scottish Qualifications Authority (SQA). The attainment level is roughly equivalent to the second year of a 3-year English degree or to a Diploma of Higher Education. An HND takes two years of full-time study, or one year full-time following successful completion of a Higher National Certificate; part-time study takes longer.

In Nigeria, HND is a continuation of a National Diploma (ND-[equivalent to associate degree]) programme, both offered by polytechnics. The ND and HND programmes have a duration of two years each with one-year break after the ND programme for an Industrial Training (IT) attachment in relevant industries. At the completion of an HND programme, the graduate would have spent 4 to 5 years; hence, Higher National Diplomas are sometimes referred to "equivalent" of a University bachelor's degree or four years of a university education. Although, there have existed a long-standing disagreement over the "equivalence" of Polytechnic HND degree to University bachelor's degree; employers of labour (including the government and its policies) have discriminated against HND holders—grading them below their university counterparts and preventing them from attaining managerial or directorate cadres. However, following series of efforts by polytechnic students/lecturers and concerned entities, the federal government has made attempts to remove the dichotomy between Polythecnic HND degree holders and University degree holders in places of employment, and the efforts are paying off as some of the government organisations (especially paramilitary) have started upgrading and employing the HND-holders at par with their University  Degree counterparts. The HND degree offers limited liberal arts subjects and goes straight  into the technicalities of a course using industry standards from year one of OND (one can only gain admission into a HND program after completing two years of OND, an equivalent of an associate degree) and by the final year of HND the student is already equipped to practice in the field.

In Scotland, an HND is Level 8 on the Scottish Credit and Qualifications Framework and in England, Wales and Northern Ireland it is Level 5 on the Regulated Qualifications Framework/Credit and Qualifications Framework for Wales. It is quite common for those who have achieved an HND to add to their qualification by progressing to other levels such as professional qualifications, a degree or a "Top-Up" degree. The entry requirements for HND in these countries also differ. One does not require an OND to get into a HND program in England, it is a stand-alone 2-year program making the curriculum and course work different from that in some countries that offer HND degree as a progression of an OND degree.

See also
Diploma
Higher diploma
Professional certification

References

External links
 Directgov: Higher National Certificates and Higher National Diplomas

Qualifications
Educational qualifications in the United Kingdom
Educational qualifications in England
Educational qualifications in Wales
Educational qualifications in Northern Ireland
Educational qualifications in Scotland
Undergraduate education